EIFS may refer to:

Exterior insulation finishing system
Extended interframe space

See also 
 EIF (disambiguation)